Zorro is a 1975 swashbuckling adventure Hindi film directed by Shibu Mitra, starring Rekha, Navin Nischol, Danny Denzongpa and Bindu.

Plot
Maharaj Bahadur Singh falls in love with Parvati, gets intimate with her, resulting in her getting pregnant, but he is forced to marry a much wealthier woman. After giving birth to a son, Gunawar, Parvati disappears from Bahadur's life. Bahadur's wife also gives birth to a boy, Vikram, and compels her husband to make him the next Maharaj. Gunawar excels in swordplay, grows up, albeit a bit senile and childlike, while Vikram grows up arrogant, befriends Senapati Shamsher Singh, and both hope to take over the reins of this kingdom. When Bahadur opposes their sinister designs, Shamsher has him arrested and lodged in a dungeon. When Gunawar finds out that atrocities are carried out by Shamsher and Vikram, he dons a mask, calls himself Zorro, and comes to the rescue of Shamsher's victims. The wily Shamsher concocts a scheme with a convict, Sher Singh, to lure and kill Zorro. But Murphy's Law prevails, and Sher and Zorro become friends. But not for long as they are destined to become mortal enemies, especially after Sher finds out that Zorro is really Rajkumar Gunawar and is colluding with Shamsher to carry out atrocities on the villagers

Cast 
Navin Nischol as Bade Rajkumar Gunawar Bahadur Singh / Zorro
Rekha as Rajkumari Rekha
Danny Denzongpa as Sher Singh
Aruna Irani as Sher Singh's Girlfriend
Bindu as Nisha
Om Shivpuri as Maharaj Bahadur Singh 
Urmila Bhatt as Maharani
Mukri as Maniram
Master Bhagwan as Villager
Asit Sen as Daroga 
Sudhir as Chhote Rajkumar Vikram Bahadur Singh
Imtiaz Khan as Senapati Shamsher Singh
Paidi Jairaj as Guruji

Soundtrack
Music by Kalyanji-Anandji.

References

External links

1975 films
Films scored by Kalyanji Anandji
1970s Hindi-language films
Zorro films
1970s American films